Footscray Thistle Football Club was an Anglo-Celtic backed association football (soccer) club from Melbourne, Australia. Throughout its existence, the club participated in the Football Victoria state league system, where it spent twenty-two of its twenty-four seasons in the Victorian State First Tier league, now the National Premier Leagues Victoria. As of the 2020 season, Footscray is still regarded as one of the most successful Victorian clubs, with five first tier premierships, one conference premiership one championship and four Dockerty Cups.

Honours
Victorian State First Tier
Premiers (5): 1924, 1926, 1928, 1929, 1932 
Runner's Up (3): 1919, 1923, 1927
Victorian State First Tier Conference
Premiers (1): 1930 (north)
Victorian State Second Tier
Runner's Up (1): 1938
Dockerty Cup
Premiers (4): 1919, 1927, 1930, 1932
Runner's Up (2): 1924, 1936

References

Soccer clubs in Melbourne
Association football clubs established in 1913
1913 establishments in Australia
Victorian Premier League teams
1940 disestablishments in Australia
Association football clubs disestablished in 1940
Defunct soccer clubs in Australia